Cerezo is a municipality located in the province of Cáceres, Extremadura, western Spain.

References

Municipalities in the Province of Cáceres